Four Songs EP is the preceding EP to Matt Pond PA's fifth album Emblems. It was released in 2004.

Track listing
 "Closest (Look Out)" – 4:50
 "Lily One" – 3:22
 "Red Ankles" – 3:30
 "Counting Song" – 5:45

Personnel
Drums: Mike Kennedy, Nic "Hollywood" Brown, Dan Crowell, Ira Kaplan
Keyboards: Brian Pearl, Lou Lino, Mike Kennedy, Matthew Pond
Electric Guitars: Jim Kehoe, Brian Pearl, Mike Kennedy, Matthew Pond
Bass: Will Levatino, Brian Pearl, Mike Kennedy, Lou Lino, Matthew Pond (four notes)
Pedal Steel: Lou Lino
Cello: Eve Miller
Vocals: Matthew Pond, Eve Miller, Lou Lino, Beth Wawerna, Matt Raisch, Mary Garito, Mike Kennedy

Technical personnel
Produced by Louie Lino (with help from Mike Kennedy and Matthew Pond)
Engineered by Louie Lino (with help from Mike Kennedy)
Song (1) mixed by Andy Wallace
Songs (2,3,4) mixed by Louie Lino
Mastered by Greg Calbi at Sterling Sound

2004 EPs
Matt Pond PA EPs